The 1912–13 Southern Football League season was the 19th in the history of the Southern League, a football competition in England. This season saw no First Division teams apply for election to the Football League. Plymouth Argyle won the league championship whilst Brentford and Stoke were relegated to Division Two. Cardiff City won the Division Two championship. They were promoted to Division One along with runners-up Southend United. No Second division teams left the league this season.

Division One

A total of 20 teams contest the division, including 18 sides from previous season and two new teams.

Teams promoted from 1911–12 Division Two:
 Merthyr Town - champions
 Portsmouth - runners-up

Division Two

A total of 13 teams contest the division, including 8 sides from previous season, one team relegated from Division One and four new teams.

Team relegated from 1911–12 Division One:
 Luton Town
Newly elected teams:
 Mid Rhondda
 Newport County
 Swansea Town
 Llanelly

External links
Southern League First Division Tables at RSSSF
Southern League Second Division Tables at RSSSF
Football Club History Database

1912-13
1911–12 in English association football leagues
1912–13 in Welsh football